Zalasius is a genus of crabs in the family Xanthidae, containing the following species:

 Zalasius australis (Baker, 1906)
 Zalasius dromiaeformis (De Haan, 1839)
 Zalasius horii Miyake, 1940
 Zalasius imajimai Takeda & Miyake, 1969
 Zalasius indicus Sankarankutty, 1968
 Zalasius sakaii Balss, 1938

References

Xanthoidea